ABC Television most commonly refers to:
ABC Television Network of the American Broadcasting Company, United States, or
ABC Television (Australian TV network), a division of the Australian Broadcasting Corporation, Australia

ABC Television or ABC television may also refer to:

Australian TV stations
ABC TV (Australian TV channel), the flagship TV station of the ABC television network of the Australian Broadcasting Corporation
ABC (TV station), Canberra, and other ABC TV local stations in state capitals
ABC Australia (Southeast Asian TV channel), an international pay TV channel

Other countries
Asahi Broadcasting Corporation, Japan
ABC Weekend TV (1956–1968), United Kingdom
ABC Television (Nepal), a 2008 Nepali television channel
ABC Development Corporation, former name of the TV5 Network, Philippines
Associated Broadcasting Company, the original name of Associated Television (ATV), United Kingdom
ABC Television-Africa, a former TV station in Sierra Leone
ABC-TV (Paraguayan TV channel), since 2017

See also 
ABC News (disambiguation)
ABC1 (disambiguation)
ABC-TV (disambiguation)